Zhivko Sedlarski (born September 16, 1958, in Bulgaria, is a Bulgarian-French sculptor. He lives in France.

Biography 
Jivko Sedlarski was introduced to art at a very young age by his father the artist-painter Kolio Sedlarski. He graduated from the Academy of Fine Arts in Sofia then became a teacher at the Puchkine College in Sofia.

Exhibitions (selection) 
Years 2010

 2021: 
 DevaM- Autumn, park castle Coupvray / France
 DevaM-C, Crevin / France
2020: 
Arbre bleu, Crevin / France
 2019 :
 Plovdiv - European Capital of Culture, Aspect, Gallery Plovdiv / Bulgaria
 Inauguration of a monumental sculpture "La Bretonne", Sens de Bretagne / France
 “Haute Soudure” parade, Grand Hôtel Primoretz, Burgas / Bulgaria
 Castle of the Fathers, Piré-sur-Seiche / France

 2018 :
 Jinji Lake Biennale Suzhou / China
 Guns of Wind -  Code Success Fondation, Sofia / Bulgaria
 Seewines galerie, Sofia / Bulgaria
 Bulgarian Fashion Icon, Vitosha Park Hotel, Sofia / Bulgaria
 Project for Albena resort / Bulgaria
 Château du Bois-Guy, Parigné / France
 Artcurial, Lyon / France

 2017 :
 35th Cultural Happy Hour Jivko Sedlarski - Bulgarian Haute Couture, Inspiring Culture, Brussels / Belgium
 Galerie NESI, Burgas / Bulgaria
 Qu Art Museum-Inauguration, Suzhou / China
 University d’Édimbourg / Scotland
 University Libre de Bruxelles / Belgium
 Port of Antwerp, Anvers / Belgium
 L’Océan, mural, 840 m2, Suzhou Center / China
 Haute Soudure, Château du Boi Guy, Parigné / France
 Artcurial, Lyon / France
 Des oeuvres de Jivko Sedlarski au centre culture, Saint-Pierre-de-Plesguen, France
 2016 :
 Queen Elizabeth Olympic Park, Londres / England
 Haute Soudure Bowling Center - Cap Malo, La Mézière / France
 Woman on the Bike, laiton, H : 2,20 m, Taihu Lake-Suzhou / China
 Skating Women's, laiton, H : 2,50 m, Taihu Lake-Suzhou / China
 Rainbow In the Dark, acier inoxydable, H : 3,00 m, Lake Mansion-Suzhou / China
 Haute Soudure, Parigné
 Artcurial, Lyon / France
 2015 :
 Robe Pétillante, Beaune / France
 Qu Art Suzhou / China
 Féminalise, Beaune / France
 Primavera, Galerie Rive Gauche, Namur / Belgium
 Galerie Valer, Sofia / Bulgaria
 Spazio Solferino 40, Milan / Italia
 2014 : 
 Ploum'expo, salle Ploum'expo, Ploumagoar
 2011 : 
 Exposition au musée Utrillo-Valadon

References 

21st-century sculptors
1958 births
Bulgarian sculptors
Living people